Francis William Lyon (10 August 1895 – 28 January 1964) was an Australian rules footballer who played with Melbourne in the Victorian Football League (VFL).

Notes

External links 

 

1895 births
1964 deaths
Australian rules footballers from Victoria (Australia)
Melbourne Football Club players